was a Japanese daimyō of the Azuchi–Momoyama Period to early Edo period. He fought at the side of Tokugawa Ieyasu at the Battle of Sekigahara in 1600. He was also an ordained Shin Buddhist priest.

Katsuhige's daimyō family claimed descent from the Shibukawa branch of the Seiwa Genji.  The Itakura identified its clan origins in Mikawa Province, and the descendants of Katsuhige were considered the elder branch of the clan.

Katsuhige was sometimes identified by his title, Iga-no kami.

He served in the Tokugawa shogunate as the second Kyoto Shoshidai, holding office in the period spanning the years from 1601 through 1620.  In addition to administrative duties, the shoshidai'''s participation in ceremonial events served a function in consolidating the power and influence of the shogunate.  For example, in September 1617, a Korean delegation was received by Hidetada at Fushimi Castle, and Katsuhige was summoned for two reasons (1) for the Koreans, to underscore the importance accorded the embassy, and (2) for the kuge courtiers in attendance, to make sure that they were properly impressed.

Katsushige was succeeded in this role by his eldest son, Shigemune, who held the office from 1620 through 1654. The merit earned by Katsushigu and Shigemune was remembered years later when devastation of the Itakura family was threatened by the otherwise unpardonable actions of a descendant.

He was unusual in that he was one of the "new men" in the close service of Tokugawa Ieyasu. After the Siege of Osaka, Katsushige was entrusted with enforcing the newly promulgated Kuge Shohatto code of conduct for court nobles.  He was the senior shogunate official overseeing the completion of Nijō Castle's construction in 1603.

His grave is at Chōen-ji Temple, in modern-day Nishio, Aichi.

Family
 Father: Itakura Yoshishige
 Mother: Honda Mitsutsugu’s daughter
 Wife: Ao Nagakatsu’s daughter
 Children:
 Itakura Shigemune by Ao Nagakatsu’s daughter
 Itakura Shigemasa by Ao Nagakatsu’s daughter
 Itakura Shigeo
 daughter married Toda Mitsumasa
 daughter married Kawamura Shigehisa
 Maki Kodayu
 daughter married Ando Shigeyoshi

Notes

References
 Bolitho, Harold. (1974). Treasures Among Men: The Fudai Daimyo in Tokugawa Japan. New Haven: Yale University Press.  ;  OCLC 185685588
 Meyer, Eva-Maria. (1999). Japans Kaiserhof in de Edo-Zeit: Unter besonderer Berücksichtigung der Jahre 1846 bis 1867. Münster: Tagenbuch. 
 Murdoch, James and Isoh Yamagata. (1903–1926). London: Kegan Paul, Trubner. OCLC 502662122
 Nussbaum, Louis Frédéric and Käthe Roth. (2005). Japan Encyclopedia. Cambridge: Harvard University Press. ; OCLC 48943301
 Papinot, Jacques Edmund Joseph. (1906) Dictionnaire d'histoire et de géographie du japon. Tokyo: Librarie Sansaisha...Click link for digitized 1906 Nobiliaire du japon (2003)
 Sasaki Suguru. (2002). Boshin sensō: haisha no Meiji ishin. Tokyo: Chūōkōron-shinsha.
 Screech, Timon. (2006). Secret Memoirs of the Shoguns:  Isaac Titsingh and Japan, 1779–1822.'' London: RoutledgeCurzon.  ' OCLC 635224064
 Toby, Ronald P. (1991).  State and Diplomacy in Early Modern Japan: Asia in the Development of the Tokugawa Bakufu. Stanford: Stanford University Press.

External links
 Document from Katsushige's tenure as Kyoto Shoshidai

Daimyo
Kyoto Shoshidai
Itakura clan
1545 births
1624 deaths
Jōdo Shinshū Buddhist priests